Dubovsky District is an administrative and municipal district (raion), one of the forty-three in Rostov Oblast, Russia. It is located in the east of the oblast. Its administrative center is the rural locality (a selo) of Dubovskoye. As of the 2010 Census, the total population of the district was 22,983, with the population of Dubovskoye accounting for 37.2% of that number.

History
The district was established in 1924 within Salsky Okrug of South Eastern Krai (Oblast) on the territories of former Ilyinskaya Volost and a part of Atamanskaya Volost. When Rostov Oblast was established in 1937, the district became its part. In 1962–1965, the district was merged into Zimovnikovsky District, but was re-established in modern borders in January 1965.

References

Notes

Sources

Districts of Rostov Oblast
States and territories established in 1924
States and territories disestablished in 1962
States and territories established in 1965
